The 2013 Clarkson Cup is a women's ice hockey tournament that was contested in Markham, Ontario to determine the champion of the Canadian Women's Hockey League from March 20 to March 23, 2013. The Boston Blades defeated the Montreal Stars by a 5-2 tally to claim their first title in team history. The tournament was played at Markham Centennial Centre.

Promotion

On March 7, 2013, the Clarkson Cup was given a permanent home in the Hockey Hall of Fame.

Round robin
On March 22, the Toronto Furies and Brampton Thunder competed in the final game of the round robin. Rebecca Johnston scored the game-winning goal on an assist from Natalie Spooner with one second remaining in overtime.

Standings

Championship game

Blades championship roster

Awards and honours
Most Valuable Player, Catherine Ward, Montreal Stars
First Star of the Game, Kelley Steadman, Boston Blades
Second Star of the Game, Caroline Ouellette, Montreal Stars
Third Star of the Game, Genevieve Lacasse, Boston Blades

Clarkson Cup All-Star Team
Goaltender, Genevieve Lacasse, Boston Blades
Defense, Catherine Ward, Montreal Stars
Defense, Gigi Marvin, Boston Blades
Forward, Kate Buesser, Boston Blades
Forward, Haley Irwin, Montreal Stars
Forward, Sarah Vaillancourt, Montreal Stars

References

Clarkson Cup
2013